General Sir Charles Phibbs Jones,  (29 June 1906 – 4 January 1988) was a British Army officer who reached high office in the 1950s.

Military career
Charles Jones was commissioned into the Royal Engineers on 3 September 1925. He saw service with the Royal Bombay Sappers and Miners in India between 1928 and 1934 and then became adjutant for the Royal Engineers Contingent within the 42nd (East Lancashire) Division in 1934.

Jones served in the Second World War, initially as brigade major for the 127th Infantry Brigade, commanded by Brigadier John Smyth, which formed part of the British Expeditionary Force dispatched to France and Belgium in 1940. Following this, he was an instructor at the Staff College from 1940 to 1941, when he became a general staff officer at General Headquarters Home Forces. In 1943 he was appointed Commander Royal Engineers for the Guards Armoured Division. He became Chief of Staff Malaya Command in 1945 and then brigadier on the general staff of XXX Corps in North West Europe in 1945.

After the war, Jones was appointed brigadier on the general staff at Western Command in 1946. He then went to the Imperial Defence College in 1947 before being appointed commander 2nd Infantry Brigade in 1948. In 1950 he became director of plans at the War Office and in 1951 he went on to be general officer commanding 7th Armoured Division, part of British Army of the Rhine.

Jones was commandant at the Staff College, Camberley from 1954 to 1956 and then vice attorney general at the War Office from 1957 to 1958. He then became director of the Combined Military Planning Staff at the Central Treaty Organisation in 1959 and general officer commanding 1 British Corps in 1960. He was general officer commanding-in-chief Northern Command from 1962 to 1963, when he became Master-General of the Ordnance; he retired in 1967.

Jones was also colonel commandant of the Royal Engineers from 1961 to 1972. He was Chief Royal Engineer from 1972 to 1977.

His son was General Sir Edward Jones who, like his father, became a member of the Army Board.

Retirement
In retirement Jones was governor of the Royal Hospital Chelsea from 1969 to 1975, and National President of the British Legion from 1970 to 1981.

References

External links
British Army Officers 1939–1945
Generals of World War II

|-

|-
 

|-

|-
 

|-

 

|-

 

1906 births
1988 deaths
Academics of the Staff College, Camberley
Graduates of the Royal College of Defence Studies
British Army generals
British Army brigadiers of World War II
British military personnel of the Palestine Emergency
Commandants of the Staff College, Camberley
Commanders of the Order of the British Empire
Graduates of the Royal Military Academy, Woolwich
Graduates of the Staff College, Camberley
Knights Grand Cross of the Order of the Bath
People educated at Portora Royal School
Recipients of the Military Cross
Royal Engineers officers
Military personnel from County Kerry
People from Kenmare